Nile University of Nigeria (NILE) is a private multidisciplinary university established in 2009 and located in Abuja, Nigeria. It is a member of the Honoris United Universities Network and accredited by the National Universities Commission. Currently, it has six faculties and a School of Postgraduate Studies offering 34 undergraduate programs and 47 postgraduate programs.

In addition to its standard academic programs, Nile University of Nigeria—through its Centre for Lifelong Learning (CELL)— offers short, on-demand, professional courses that are tailored to the needs of the participants.

In 2020, Nile University joined the Honoris United Universities network becoming one of the 14 member Universities alongside ESPRIT and Université Mundiapolis.

In March 2021, Nile University accepted to partner with the Ministry of Science and Technology in the production of the COVID-19 vaccine.

History 
Nile University, founded in 2009 and sited on a 113-hectare campus got acquired in July 2020 by Actis Capital backed Honoris United Universities becoming one of its member universities alongside educational institutions in countries of Tunisia (IMSET), Morocco (EMSI), Mauritius (Honoris Educational Network), South Africa (Mancosa, Regent Business School) Zimbabwe and Zambia. Nigeria is also the education group's first entry into West Africa. At the time of formation, NILE had three faculties (Arts & Social Sciences, Engineering, and Natural & Applied Sciences) and 93 students. In June 2021, the University's logo was changed

The university as a result of structural changes in administration,  changes its logo in 21 June 2021.

In a bid to restructure the face of the institution,  in June 21, 2021 the University changed it logo to mirror the objectives.

Academics
The university currently offers undergraduate and postgraduate programs across 6 faculties:

Faculty of Engineering

 Computer Engineering (BEng, PGD, MEng)
 Electrical and Electronics Engineering (BEng, PGD, MEng, PhD)
 Civil Engineering (BEng, PGD, MEng)
 Petroleum and Gas Engineering (BEng, PGD, MEng)
 Chemical Engineering (BEng)
 Mechanical Engineering (BEng)
 Mechatronics Engineering (BEng)
 Architecture (BSc)

Faculty of Natural and Applied Sciences

 Software Engineering (BSc)
 Information Technology (BSc)
 Biology (BSc, PGD, MSc)
 Biotechnology (BSc)
 Biochemistry (BSc)
 Microbiology (BSc)
 Computer Science (BSc, PGD, MSc, PhD)
 Analytical Chemistry (MSc)
 Industrial Chemistry (BSc, MSc, PhD)

Faculty of Arts and Social Sciences

 Economics (BSc, PGD, MSc, MPhil, PhD)
 Financial Economics (MSc)
 Financial Economics (MFE)
 English Language and Communication Studies (BSc, MA)
 Political Science and International Relations (BSc)
 International Relations and Diplomacy (PGD, MSc, PhD)
 International Relations (MIR)
 Political Science (PGD, MSc, PhD)
 Peace, Conflict and Strategic Studies (PGD, MSc, MPhil, PhD)
 Mass Communication (BSc)
 Criminology and Security Studies (BSc)
 Sociology (BSc)
 Psychology (BSc)

Faculty of Management Sciences 

 Business Administration (BSc)
 Master of Business Administration (MBA)
 Management (PGD, MSc, MPhil, PhD)
 Banking and Finance (BSc)
 Public Administration (BSc)
 Accounting (BSc, PGD, MSc, P.hD)
 Auditing & Finance (MSc)
 Auditing & Forensic Management (MSc)
 Estate Management (BSc)
 Marketing (BSc)

Faculty of Law 
 Law (LLB)
 Law (PGD)
 Law (LLM)
 Law (PhD)

College of Health Sciences 
 Medicine and Surgery (MBBS)
 Human Anatomy (BSc)
 Human Physiology (BSc)
 Public Health (MPH)

Library 

The Nile University of Nigeria Library is an academic library that serves the information needs of staff, students and researchers in the Nile University of Nigeria community.[citation needed]

The Nile University of Nigeria Library was established in 2009 (the same year the university was established) to support the teaching, learning and research objectives of the university. The library is located beside the Block B building with over 22,000 volumes of collections (serials inclusive). The library provides information materials in print and electronic formats to serve the needs of staff and students of faculty of arts and social sciences, faculty of management sciences, faculty of Natural and applied sciences, faculty of law, faculty of engineering and college of health science. There is a separate library for the faculty of law students and staff which is located in the faculty of law building of the university. The library uses an integrated library management software 'YORDAM' to automate it services. [citation needed]

The library collections over the years have grown to 22,000 volumes of monographs and electronic resources. There are 700 volumes of periodicals, including both local and foreign journals. The library also subscribes to research databases for students to access at the e-library section of the library. These include: Ebscohost, Research4Life, Heinonline, LexisNexis, Web of Science, JSTOR.[citation needed]

Accreditation 
The university's degrees are accredited by the Nigerian Universities Commission (NUC) and professional authorities including ICAN, COREN, Council of Legal Education and Medical and Dental Council of Nigeria (MDCN). The Faculty of law  got approval from the Council of Legal Education (CLE) to run Postgraduate Law programs and is set to admit postgraduate students from 2022/2023 session.

Sports & scholarships 

Nile University hosts a basketball team called Nile Spartans formed in 2018 which regularly featured in the second tier of the Nigerian National Basketball League and won the prestigious National Division Two in November 2019 and the Sam Ogwuche International Sports Foundation tournament in June 2021.

The team, joined the National Division One league and won the league in 2021.

The university offers full sports scholarships to students with outstanding performance in sports at national or professional level if they participate in the Nile basketball team. There are also partial academic scholarships for students which range from 10% to 100% and are based on students’ performances in the West African Examination Council (WAEC) and Joint Admissions and Matriculation Board (JAMB) exams.

The university's athletes have participated in various major competitions where it won the 2018 West African University Games, the 8th National Swimming Championship (2018) and the World Junior Tennis Tour (2019).

In February 2022, Nile University qualified for the 26th edition of the Nigerian University Games (NUGA) that was held in University of Lagos. It was the first appearance of the university and the sport team came back as the third placed University on the medals table.

Student representative council (SRC) 
Student representative council consists of undergraduate students elected to represent members from their respective academic units. It is led by a President assisted by a vice-president and several other members of the executive committee elected individually.

References

 

Buildings and structures in Abuja
Education in Abuja
Educational institutions established in 1998
1998 establishments in Nigeria
Private universities and colleges in Nigeria